FM 103 may refer to:

Mast FM 103, a Pakistani radio channel
Farm to Market Road 103